Cosmorhaphe is an ichnogenus representing grazing feeding behavior (pascichnia).

The Renaissance naturalist Ulisse Aldrovandi discussed and described a specimen of Cosmorhaphe, which is therefore among the first fossils to be illustrated

References

Trace fossils